Shidōkan may refer to:

Shōrin-ryū Shidōkan, the main branch of Shorin-ryū style of Okinawan karate
Shidōkan Karate, Japanese hybrid fighting karate, known as "The Triathlon of Martial Arts"